Classic Crack is a compilation album by American rock 
band Crack the Sky, released in 1980.

Track listing

Note: the cassette version of this album includes two previously unreleased songs:

"Let Me Go Home (A Visit to the Projects)" – 3:28
"Eileen, I Lean on You" – 3:53

These two tracks later appeared as bonus tracks on the CD reissue of the band's eponymous debut.

Personnel

John Palumbo — Guitar, lead vocals
Gary Lee Chappell — Lead vocals ("Nuclear Apathy", "Lighten Up McGraw", "Eileen, I Lean on You")
Rick Witkowski — Lead guitar
Joe Macre — Bass guitar, harmonies
Jim Griffiths — Lead guitar, harmonies
Joey D'Amico — Drums, harmonies, lead vocals ("Long Nights")

1980 compilation albums
Crack the Sky albums